WEST, Tungsten (chemical symbol "W") Environment in Steady-state Tokamak, (formerly Tore Supra) is a French tokamak that originally began operating as Tore Supra after the discontinuation of TFR (Tokamak of Fontenay-aux-Roses) and of Petula (in Grenoble). The original name came from the words torus and superconductor, as Tore Supra was for a long time the only tokamak of this size with superconducting toroidal magnets, allowing the creation of a strong permanent toroidal magnetic field.  After a major upgrade to install tungsten walls and a divertor, the tokamak was renamed WEST.

WEST is situated at the nuclear research center of Cadarache, Bouches-du-Rhône in Provence, one of the sites of the Commissariat à l'Énergie Atomique.  Tore Supra operated between 1988 and 2010. Its goal was to create long-duration plasmas.  The upgrade to WEST took place between 2013 and 2016.  WEST has been operating since 2016.

Tore Supra holds the record of the longest plasma duration time for a tokamak (6 minutes 30 seconds and over 1000 MJ of energy injected and extracted in 2003), and it allowed researchers to test critical parts of equipment such as plasma facing wall components or superconducting magnets that will be used in its successor, ITER.

Device parameters 
Tore Supra as of 1988:
 Major plasma radius (machine centre to plasma centre) : 2.25 m 
 Minor plasma radius: 0.70 m
 Toroidal magnetic field on the center of the plasma core: 4.5 T
 Plasma current: 1.7 MA
 Longest plasma discharge (predicted): 1000 s
 Auxiliary plasma heating (ion and electron cyclotron resonance heating and lower hybrid current drive): 20 MW
Tore Supra as of 2006 (parameters essentially the same):
 Weight of NbTi superconductor : ~45 tonnes
 Maximum magnetic field on the conductor : 9.0 T  
 Total magnetic energy : 600 MJ
 Weight of magnetic circuit : 830 tonnes

WEST as of 2018:

Major plasma radius (machine centre to plasma centre) : 2.5 m
 Minor plasma radius: 0.50 m
 Toroidal magnetic field on the center of the plasma core: 3.7 T
 Plasma current: 1 MA
 Longest plasma discharge (predicted): 1000 s
 Auxiliary plasma heating (ion and electron cyclotron resonance heating and lower hybrid current drive): 17 MW

Tore Supra Operation 1988-2010

By 1998 it had produced over 20,000 plasma shots of up to 2 minutes duration.

Between 2000 and 2002 the vacuum chamber was completely renewed/relined. increasing the power extraction by active cooling to 25 MW (to allow longer plasma duration).

In Dec 2003 it achieved a record 6.5 minute plasma This was plasma shot #32299, Lower hybrid power ~2.9 MW, total injected energy ~1.1 GJ, plasma current ~500 kA, nl ~ 2.6x1019/m2.

WEST 

Beginning in March 2013 Tore Supra underwent an extensive refit, including new poloidal coils to achieve diverted operation, a new cooling system, and all-metal cladding, mainly for experiments on tungsten divertor technology for ITER.
The reactor was renamed WEST, for "Tungsten (chemical symbol "W") Environment in Steady-state Tokamak". WEST achieved first plasma in December 2016.

References

External links 
Tore Supra Official Site EURATOM-CEA (in French)
Tore Supra Official Site - in English
Tore Supra photos
 Tore Supra video gallery

Tokamaks
Laboratories in France